The Women's scratch at the 2014 UCI Track Cycling World Championships was held on 26 February 2014. 20 cyclists participated in the event, which was contested over 40 laps, equating to a distance of .

Medalists

Results
The race was started at 19:40.

References

2014 UCI Track Cycling World Championships
UCI Track Cycling World Championships – Women's scratch
UCI